When Disaster Strikes... is the second studio album by American rapper Busta Rhymes, released by Elektra on September 16, 1997. The album follows the same theme as The Coming, the apocalypse. The album, upon its release, received mostly positive reviews, debuted at number three on the official US Billboard 200 album chart, and peaked at the top spot on the Top R&B Albums chart.

The album was supported by three singles: "Put Your Hands Where My Eyes Could See", "Dangerous", and "Turn It Up" – the latter two which found chart success on the US Billboard Hot 100 chart. The album's lead single, "Put Your Hands Where My Eyes Can See" (notable for its music video that lampooned the 1988 film Coming to America) earned a nomination for a Grammy Award for Best Rap Solo Performance at the 40th Grammy Awards in 1998. The album was certified platinum by the RIAA. Its second single, "Dangerous", earned Rhymes a third consecutive nomination for Best Rap Solo Performance at the 41st Grammy Awards the following year.

Commercial performance 
When Disaster Strikes... debuted at number three on the US Billboard 200 chart, selling 165,000 copies in its first week. This became Busta Rhymes's second US top-ten debut on the chart. On October 9, 1997, the album was certified platinum by the Recording Industry Association of America (RIAA) for shipments of over one million copies in the United States.

Track listing

Notes
  signifies a co-producer

Charts

Weekly charts

Year-end charts

Certifications

See also
List of number-one R&B albums of 1997 (U.S.)

References

Busta Rhymes albums
1997 albums
Albums produced by Sean Combs
Albums produced by J Dilla
Albums produced by Easy Mo Bee
Albums produced by Rashad Smith
Albums produced by Rockwilder
Albums produced by DJ Scratch
Albums produced by Agallah
Elektra Records albums